Chiloglanis normani is a species of upside-down catfish endemic to Côte d'Ivoire where it occurs in the Cavally River system.  This species grows to a length of  SL.

References

External links 

normani
Catfish of Africa
Freshwater fish of West Africa
Endemic fauna of Ivory Coast
Fish described in 1933